The 2017 National Camogie League, known for sponsorship reasons as the Littlewoods Ireland Camogie Leagues, was played in spring 2017.

Kilkenny were the Division 1 champions, their third win in four seasons.

Format

League structure
The 2017 National Camogie League consists of three divisions: 11 in Division 1, 12 in Division 2 and 5 in Division 3; 1 and 2 are divided into two groups. Each team plays every other team in its group once. 3 points are awarded for a win and 1 for a draw.

If two teams are level on points, the tie-break is:
 winners of the head-to-head game are ranked ahead
 if the head-to-head match was a draw, ranking is determined by the points difference (i.e. total scored minus total conceded in all games)
 if the points difference is equal, ranking is determined by the total scored

If three or more teams are level on league points, rankings are determined solely by points difference.

Finals, promotions and relegations
The top two teams in each group in Division 1 contest the National Camogie League semi-finals.

The top two teams in each group in Division 2 contest the Division 2 semi-finals.

The top four teams in Division 3 contest the Division 3 semi-finals.

Fixtures and results

Division 1

Group 1

Kilkenny are ranked ahead of Tipperary as they won the head-to-head game between the teams
Waterford are ranked ahead of Dublin as they won the head-to-head game between the teams

Group 2

Finals

Division 2

Finals

Division 3

Finals

References

League
National Camogie League seasons